Henry Ewing may refer to:

Henry Ewing of 6th Arkansas Field Battery
Henry W. Ewing, sportsman and coach
Henry Ellsworth Ewing, acarologist (1883–1951)

See also
Harry Ewing (disambiguation)